Montserrado-13 is an electoral district for the elections to the House of Representatives of Liberia. The district covers the New Georgia Township as well as the St. Michael community of Gardnersville Township and the Stockton Creek and Jamaica Road communities of Garwolon Township.

Elected representatives

References

Electoral districts in Liberia